Şehzade Mehmed Burhaneddin Efendi (23 May 1849 – 4 November 1876) was an Ottoman prince, the son of Sultan Abdulmejid I and one of his consorts, Nükhetsezâ Hanım.

Early life
Şehzade Mehmed Burhaneddin was born on 23 May 1849 in the Old Beylerbeyi Palace. His father was Sultan Abdulmejid I, son of Sultan Mahmud II and Bezmiâlem Sultan and his mother was Nükhetsezâ Hanım. He had an older full brother, Şehzade Ahmed, and two older full sisters, Aliye Sultan and Nazime Sultan, all of whom died as newborn. After his mother's death in 1850, when he was one year old, he was adopted by another of his father's consorts, Neverser Hanim, who had no children of her own. He was circumcised on 9 April 1857 in the Dolmabahçe Palace, together with his brothers Şehzade Mehmed Reşad (future Mehmed V), Şehzade Ahmed Kemaleddin and Şehzade Ahmed Nureddin.

Personal life
Burhaneddin married three times and had one son. One of his wives was Mestinaz Hanım. She was born on 20 September 1851 in Tbilisi, Georgia. They married on 4 May 1872 in the Dolmabahçe Palace. In 1874, she gave birth to Şehzade Ibrahim Tevfik. Two years later she gave birth a daughter. She died on 20 April 1909 in the Dolmabahçe Palace, and was buried in Yavuz Selim Mosque. Another wife was Şadruh Hanım. They married in 1873. She died in 1930. Another wife was Aşkıdilber Hanım. 

In widowhood, Mestinaz, Şadruh and Aşkıdilber received a pension of 10,000 kuruş, 2880 kuruş, and 4000 kuruş respectively. In 1909, Şadruh's and Aşkıdilber's pension was raised to 10,000 kuruş each.

He owned a villa in Üsküdar. The villa was built in 1860, and was located on a hill between the Tophanelioğlu-Kısıklı road the Bosphorus Bridge ring road.

Later life and death
Sultan Abdul Hamid II trusted Burhaneddin. During his reign, he had tightened the security ring around the Çırağan Palace, where Murad V and his family were confined. Access to the palace was so severely curtailed that visitors were practically limited to the princes, such as Burhaneddin and Mehmed Reşad. 

Burhaneddin died of tuberculosis at the age of twenty-seven on 4 November 1876, and was buried in the mausoleum of his father in Yavuz Selim Mosque, Istanbul. His brother, Abdul Hamid named a battleship and one of his sons after him. He also brought up his son in his care.

Issue

Ancestry

References

Source

1849 births
1876 deaths
Royalty from Istanbul
Ottoman princes
19th-century people from the Ottoman Empire
19th-century deaths from tuberculosis
Tuberculosis deaths in the Ottoman Empire